The Canarias class was a class of heavy cruiser of the Spanish Navy. Two ships of the class were completed in the 1930s. They were built in Spain by the Vickers-Armstrongs subsidiary Sociedad Española de Construcción Naval upon a British design, and were a modified version of the Royal Navy′s County class.

Design

The ships were ordered in 1926 and were based on the British County-class cruisers. The designer was Sir Phillip Watts. These ships had anti-torpedo bulges and a slightly narrower beam as well as more powerful machinery. The boiler rooms were re-arranged compared to the British design and trunked into a single massive funnel rather than three funnels used on the British cruisers. The Spanish ships had a stronger secondary armament and although the original design included a catapult for a seaplane this was never installed.

Ships

Both ships were built by SECN in Ferrol.

A third ship was projected but not ordered.

Service history
Both ships were making their final sea trials when seized by the Nationalist side in the Spanish Civil War. Both of them were fitting out and completed with makeshift fire control and secondary armament.

Canarias was the flagship of the Nationalist Navy and sank 34 ships including the Republican destroyer  and the Soviet merchant Komsomol. She also damaged the destroyer , forcing her to seek refuge at Gibraltar.

Baleares was completed without 'Y' turret, which was retrofitted in 1937. In September 1937 she engaged two Republican light cruisers in the Battle of Cape Cherchell. During a raid on Palma de Majorca in March 1938 she was intercepted by Republican destroyers and torpedoed by the destroyer . The torpedoes blew up the forward magazines, disintegrating the fore part of the ship.

References

Bibliography

External links

 Canarias specs at Bismarck site 
 BUQUESDEGUERRA.TK, a Spanish website about warships (Spanish)

Cruiser classes